Urozhaynoye is a rural locality (a selo) and the administrative center of Urozhayny Selsoviet, Sovetsky District, Altai Krai, Russia. The population was 1,178 as of 2013. There are 14 streets.

Geography 
Urozhaynoye is located 18 km east of Sovetskoye (the district's administrative centre) by road. Lebediny is the nearest rural locality.

References 

Rural localities in Sovetsky District, Altai Krai